Emory Wellington Hines (January 7, 1913 – March 5, 1989) was an American football and baseball coach and college athletics administrator. He was the third head football coach at the Louisiana Negro Normal and Industrial Institute—now known as Grambling State University—in Grambling, Louisiana, serving for six seasons, from 1935 to 1940, and compiling a record of 4–11–2. Hines was also the head baseball coach at Southern University from 1963 to 1976.

Hines died following a long illness in 1989.

Head coaching record

References

1913 births
1989 deaths
Grambling State Tigers football coaches
Samuel Huston Dragons football coaches
Southern Jaguars and Lady Jaguars athletic directors
Southern Jaguars baseball coaches
Southern Jaguars football coaches